Kingsley Eloho Ogoro (born August 29, 1965), is a Nigerian film director, screenwriter, music producer and former dancer. He is best known for the 2003 film Osuofia in London starring Nkem Owoh, and has since worked mainly as a producer and director in the Nollywood film industry.

Early life
Ogoro attended the University of Sokoto where he studied Banking & Finance, graduating in 1988, but remained interested in music despite his parents' disapproval. Prior to his university education, he reached the John Player Disco Dancing Championships finals, after which he began focusing on a music career as a producer.

Personal life
Ogoro was previously married to former pop singer Esse Agesse. Their daughter, Ewoma, was Miss Nigeria Ireland in 2012.

Producer
The Widow (2005)
Across the Niger (2004)
Osuofia in London 2 (2004)
Veno (2004)
Dangerous Babe (2003)
Osuofia in London (2003)

Director
The Widow (2005)
Osuofia in London 2 (2004)
Veno (2004)
Osuofia in London (2003)
The Return (2003)

Writer
The Widow (2005)
Osuofia in London 2 (2004)
Osuofia in London (2003)

See also
 List of Nigerian film producers

References

External links

Nigerian film directors
Nigerian film producers
Nigerian screenwriters
Living people
Nigerian dancers
1965 births